Made in Heaven is a 1952 British Technicolor comedy film directed by John Paddy Carstairs which stars David Tomlinson, Petula Clark and Sonja Ziemann. The screenplay was based on a story by William Douglas-Home. It was shot at Pinewood Studios outside London. The film's sets were designed by the art director Maurice Carter.

Plot summary
Young married couple Basil (David Tomlinson) and Julie Topham (Petula Clark) enter the ancient annual Dunmow Flitch Trials (in which a married couple can win a side of bacon if at the end of one year, they have 'not wisht themselves unmarried again'). However, the Topham's happy household, and then an entire village is thrown into chaos with the arrival of an attractive Hungarian housemaid (Sonja Ziemann).

Cast

 David Tomlinson as Basil Topham
 Petula Clark as Julie Topham
 Sonja Ziemann as Marta
 A. E. Matthews as Hillary Topham (Grandpa)
 Charles Victor as Aubrey Topham
 Sophie Stewart as Marjorie Topham
 Philip Stainton as Stanley Grimes
 Richard Wattis as Hayworth Honeycroft, the Vicar
 Michael Brennan as Sergeant Marne
 Alfie Bass as Bert Jenkins
 Dora Bryan as Ethel Jenkins
 Ferdy Mayne as István
 Athene Seyler as Miss Rosabelle Honeycroft (the Vicar's sister)
 Harold Kasket as The Fat Man	
  George Bishop as The Bishop	
  Margot Lister as Bishop's Wife	
  John Warren as Keeper of the Wheel	
  Ronnie Stevens as TV Announcer	
  Gilbert Davis as TV Gent	
 Stuart Latham as Porter	
 Vernon Morris as Dick
 Vincent Ball as Man at Party

Critical reception
In 1952, Picturegoer wrote, ". . .when you get down to analysing the ingredients, it's just cream-puff comedy, really – and the least bit stale cream puff at that. The main thing though is not to analyse but to swallow it whole and enjoy it. It's well-tried and not always especially true British comedy, but the film has a happy air about it. Attractively grown-up Pet Clark turns in a sparkling performance as the doubting young wife. She manages to hold her own against the devastating eyelashes and flashing, wicked smiles of Sonja Ziemann as the hired help. But it's the old hands at this kind of comedy who really carry the fun along: David Tomlinson, Charles Victor and A. E. Matthews, as son, father and grandfather respectively, all stock characters. Yes it's all gay and merry. It has a springtime spirit – and a springtime look, too in its spruce, sunny Technicolour"; while more recently, the Radio Times concluded, "Vicar Richard Wattis and his stern sister (Athene Seyler) add considerably to the fun, which is steadily directed in an amiably sitcom-like way by John Paddy Carstairs and glossily photographed by Geoffrey Unsworth."

References

External links

1952 films
1952 comedy films
Films directed by John Paddy Carstairs
Films shot at Pinewood Studios
British comedy films
Films set in London
Films scored by Ronald Hanmer
1950s English-language films
1950s British films